Óscar Alberto Meneses Roa (born 7 March 1960) is a Chilean football manager and former footballer.

References

External links
 Óscar Meneses at playmakerstats.com (English version of ceroacero.es)

1960 births
Living people
Footballers from Santiago
Chilean footballers
Club Deportivo Universidad Católica footballers
Naval de Talcahuano footballers
Trasandino footballers
Real Oviedo players
Unión San Felipe footballers
Provincial Osorno footballers
Rangers de Talca footballers
R.A.A. Louviéroise players
Chilean Primera División players
Segunda División players
Primera B de Chile players
Challenger Pro League players
Chilean expatriate footballers
Expatriate footballers in Spain
Chilean expatriate sportspeople in Spain
Expatriate footballers in Belgium
Chilean expatriate sportspeople in Belgium
Association football midfielders
Chilean football managers
Primera B de Chile managers
Chilean Primera División managers
Audax Italiano managers
Unión Española managers
Club Deportivo Universidad Católica managers
Universidad de Concepción managers
O'Higgins F.C. managers
Chilean expatriate football managers 
Expatriate football managers in Mexico
Chilean expatriate sportspeople in Mexico